Jorge Lino Romero Santa Cruz (born 23 September 1937) is a Paraguayan football forward who played for Paraguay in the 1958 FIFA World Cup. He also played for Club Sol de América.

References

External links
FIFA profile

1937 births
Paraguayan footballers
Paraguay international footballers
Association football forwards
1958 FIFA World Cup players
Club Sol de América footballers
Living people